Never Say Die! is the eighth studio album by English rock band Black Sabbath, released on 29 September 1978. It was the last studio album with the band's original lineup and the last studio album to feature original vocalist Ozzy Osbourne until the 2013 album 13. It was certified Gold in the U.S on 7 November 1997 and as of November 2011 has sold 133,000 copies in the United States since the SoundScan era. The album received mixed reviews, with critics calling it "unbalanced" and insisting its energy was scattered in too many directions.

Recording
At the time of the recording of Never Say Die! the members of Black Sabbath were all heavily involved in drug and alcohol abuse. Prior to recording, vocalist Osbourne briefly quit the band and was temporarily replaced by former Savoy Brown and Fleetwood Mac vocalist Dave Walker. In 1992, guitarist Tony Iommi explained to Guitar World, "We never wanted him to leave, and I think he wanted to come back – but no one would tell the other how they felt. So we had to bring in another singer and write all new material." The band wrote a handful of songs with Walker, with that short-lived line-up even performing an early version of what would become "Junior's Eyes" on the BBC programme Look Hear. 

Osbourne eventually rejoined, refusing to sing any of the songs written with Walker. Iommi elaborated in the 1992 Guitar World piece, 

Osbourne also refused to sing on "Breakout", which remained an instrumental. The songs with Walker were redone; "Junior's Eyes" was rewritten to be about the then-recent death of Osbourne's father. 

"We had a few internal problems," Osbourne admitted to Sounds magazine. "My father was dying, so that put us out for over three months with the funeral and everything. I left the band for three months before we got back together to record it." However, the writing was on the wall, with Osbourne stating in his memoir I Am Ozzy: "No one really talked about what had happened. I just turned up in the studio one day – I think Bill had been trying to act as peacemaker on the phone – and that was the end of it. But it was obvious things had changed, especially between me and Tony. I don't think anyone's heart was in it anymore."

The album was recorded at Sounds Interchange Studios in Toronto. "We went to Toronto to record it, and that's when the problems started," Iommi recalled. "Why Toronto? Because of the tax, really. The studio was booked through brochures because people thought it might be a good one. We got there and it had a dead sound – totally wrong. We couldn't get a real live sound. So what we had to do was rip the carpet up and try to make it as live as we could. They were okay about it, but it took time to get it exactly right. There were no other studios available." 

In 2001 Iommi elaborated to Dan Epstein of Guitar World, "I booked a studio in Toronto, and we had to find some place to rehearse. So we had this cinema that we'd go into at 10 o'clock in the morning, and it was freezing cold; it was in the heart of winter there, really awful. We'd be there, trying to write songs during the day and go and record them at night." In the same article bassist Geezer Butler added, "Never Say Die was a patch-up kind of an album ... People didn't realize that it was sort of tongue-in-cheek, the Never Say Die! thing. Because we knew that was it; we just knew it was never going to happen again. We did this 10th anniversary tour with Van Halen in 1978, and everybody's going 'Here's to another 10 years!' And I'm going, (rolls eyes) 'Yeah, sure!'" 

Butler was growing impatient with Osbourne's criticism of his lyrics, telling Guitar World in 1994: "I used to hate doing it towards the end of the Ozzy era. He'd say, 'I'm not singing that.' So you'd have to rethink the whole thing." In the 2004 book How Black Was Our Sabbath, Iommi is quoted as saying, "We were all into silly games ... and we were getting really drugged out ... We'd go down to the sessions and have to pack up because we were too stoned. Nobody could get anything right. We were all over the place. Everybody was playing a different thing."

"With Never Say Die!, we were down on our luck," Osbourne reflected to Spin magazine. "We were just a fucking bunch of guys drowning in the fucking ocean. We weren't getting along with each other and we were all fucked-up with drugs and alcohol. And I got fired. It was just a bad thing. You try to lift your head up above water, but eventually the tide sucks you under."

"They were supposed to be really wild," remarked keyboardist Don Airey. "Tony Iommi had a reputation for hitting people. So I got quite a shock when they turned out to be the nicest people I ever worked with. The first thing Ozzy did was make me a cup of tea."

In the liner notes for 1998's live Reunion, Ward defended the album: "In the circumstances, I thought we did the best we could. We were taking care of business ourselves, we didn't have millions from the record company and, despite the booze and Ozzy's departure, we tried to experiment with jazz and stuff the way we had in the early days. Songs like 'Johnny Blade' and 'Air Dance' I still like." Osbourne vehemently disagrees in his autobiography, at least as far as the jazz experiments went, calling the instrumental "Breakout" "a jazz band going da-dah-da-dah, DAH, and I just went, Fuck this, I'm off ... The bottom line was that 'Breakout' was stretching it too far for me. With tracks like that on the album, we might as well have been called Slack Haddock, not Black Sabbath. The only impressive thing about a jazz band as far as I was concerned was how much they could drink."

While Butler received credit for the lyrics of "Swinging the Chain," they were actually composed by Ward.

The sleeve was the band's second (following Technical Ecstasy) to be designed by Hipgnosis. The US and UK releases differed slightly in the faint images of British military pilots seen in the sky. The inner bag featured graphics in keeping with the sleeve and credits, but no lyrics. The aeroplane on the cover appears to be a North American T-6 Texan. The band had rejected an alternate Hipgnosis design featuring masked doctors – an image eventually used for Rainbow's 1981 album Difficult to Cure.

Release and reception

In the UK the title track, released well ahead of the album as the band's first UK picture sleeve single, reached No. 21 in the chart and gave the band its first Top of the Pops appearances since 1970. In the UK the album reached No. 12, one place higher than its predecessor Technical Ecstasy. In the US it peaked at number 69 on the Billboard Pop Album chart. In the UK, "Hard Road" was released as the second single from the album and reached the UK Top 40, 25,000 copies being pressed in a limited-edition purple-vinyl. There was no picture-sleeve release but a video for "A Hard Road" was made during the Never Say Die! Tour to promote the single. The song marks the first and last time guitarist Tony Iommi sings backing vocals. Iommi explains in his autobiography Iron Man: My Journey Through Heaven & Hell With Black Sabbath, that when he sang, bassist Geezer Butler couldn't keep a straight face. The album received mostly negative reviews and is not held in high esteem today, with AllMusic referring to the album as "unfocused", saying it "will hold little interest to the average heavy metal fan". Rolling Stone says it was "not a blaze of glory for the original foursome" but added that it may be "better than people might remember". In 2013 Phil Alexander of Mojo referred to the album as "disastrous".

Speaking in October 1978 of the new album, Osbourne said, "It's a combination of what we've all been through in the last 10 years. It's a very varied album. Like, we started out playing in blues clubs, because British blues – like John Mayall and early Fleetwood Mac – was the thing at the time. We were into a twelve-bar trip and early Ten Years After-style stuff. So it's part of that sort of trip. Then there's the heavy thing and the rock thing. It's not just steamhammer headbanging stuff all the way through ... We got rid of all our inner frustrations: what each of us individually wanted to put down over the years but couldn't because of the pressures of work. So we put a lot of painstaking hours into developing this album." However, Osbourne quickly soured on the LP, telling After Hours in a 1981 interview "The last album I did with Sabbath was Never Say Die! and it was the worst piece of work that I've ever had anything to do with. I'm ashamed of that album. I think it's disgusting". He went on to claim that the band flew to Toronto in January during sub-zero temperature "purely because the Rolling Stones had recorded a live album there." In 2013, Osbourne told Mojo, "I'd go down to the studio and I heard what sounded like a jazz band playing. Is this really Black Sabbath? I'd just fuck off." Osbourne was fired by the band eight months later.

Despite the negative reception, Soundgarden guitarist Kim Thayil cited "Never Say Die!" as one of his favourite Black Sabbath albums. Megadeth covered the title track for the 2000 tribute album Nativity In Black II, with singer Dave Mustaine telling Nick Bowcott in 2008, "The simplicity of Iommi's style makes this rhythm progression one of my all-time favorites: fast, classic English riff-stylings with a climactic arrangement." Andy LaRocque, guitarist for King Diamond, was influenced by the album in the making of the melodic guitar part of "Sleepless Nights", from the Conspiracy album.

In March 2017, Jon Hadusek of Consequence of Sound ranked Never Say Die! 10th out of 19 Black Sabbath studio albums.

Never Say Die! Tour with Van Halen
Black Sabbath's Never Say Die! Tour opened on 16 May 1978 in Sheffield with Van Halen as their opening act, who'd just scored a hit in the United States with a cover of The Kinks' "You Really Got Me." Ward's drum tech Graham Wright and Osbourne's personal assistant David Tangye, who write extensively about the tour in their 2004 book How Black Was Our Sabbath, reveal that relations between the bands got off to a shaky start at the 22 May show at the Apollo Theatre in Manchester. After Sabbath finished their soundcheck, Van Halen "hit the stage and started to play Sabbath tunes. It was their way of paying tribute to the Sabs, but Tony Iommi was annoyed by it. He may have misinterpreted the gesture as a piss-take, which it certainly was not. Van Halen were in awe of Sabbath, and their lead guitarist, Eddie Van Halen, was a big fan of Tony. The unwitting faux pas was soon forgotten. The two bands came to get along very well together, and Alex Van Halen would often sit ... behind Bill's drum kit, watching and listening to him play onstage." On the US leg of the tour, Van Halen's presence had a major influence on ticket sales since they were a much bigger draw at home than they were in the UK. Wright and Graham also recount two riots that occurred on the Never Say Die! tour, the first happening in Neunkirchen am Brand, Germany, in front of a hall crammed with "thousands of extremely stoned, drunk and rowdy GIs" when, three songs into a show, Iommi stalked off the stage because of a buzzing from his guitar stack. When the audience realized the band had quit the gig they wrecked the hall. Another riot ensued at the Municipal Auditorium in Nashville when Osbourne didn't show up and the band had to cancel; it later came to light that Osbourne had "slept right round the clock, woken up, seen that it was six o'clock, and thinking that it was still the evening before, had got ready for the show. Even more incredibly, he'd been sleeping in the wrong room." A video from this period, professionally recorded on the UK tour at the Hammersmith Odeon in June 1978, can be seen on the Sanctuary Visual Entertainment DVD, also entitled Never Say Die.

Top of the Pops appearance
With the success of the "Never Say Die!" single, Black Sabbath was invited to perform on Top of the Pops. The band twice appeared live in the studio, miming to a pre-recorded version of the song. One of these appearances was included on the official The Black Sabbath Story, Vol. 1 video release. In his autobiography, Osbourne remembers the appearance fondly "'cos we got to meet Bob Marley. I'll always remember the moment he came out of his dressing room – it was next to ours – and you literally couldn't see his head through the cloud of dope smoke. He was smoking the biggest, fattest joint I'd ever seen – and believe me, I'd seen a few. I kept thinking, He's gonna have to lip-synch, no one can do a live show when they're that high. But no – he did it live. Flawlessly, too." In his autobiography, Iommi reveals that because drummer Bill Ward had his hair in braids at the time, "everybody thought he was taking the mickey out of Bob (Marley). It wasn't like that at all; it was just the way he happened to have his hair in those days."

Track listing

Note: track four is titled "Hard Road" on the releases by Vertigo (the UK and Europe) and "A Hard Road" on the ones released by Warner (the US and Canada).

Personnel
Black Sabbath
Tony Iommi – guitar, backing vocals on "A Hard Road"
Ozzy Osbourne – lead and backing vocals
Geezer Butler – bass guitar, backing vocals on "A Hard Road"
Bill Ward – drums, lead vocals on "Swinging the Chain", backing vocals on "A Hard Road"

Additional musicians
Don Airey – keyboards
Jon Elstar – harmonica on "Swinging the Chain"
Wil Malone – brass arrangements

Charts

Certifications

References

External links
 

1978 albums
Albums with cover art by Hipgnosis
Black Sabbath albums
Vertigo Records albums
Warner Records albums